Birds Green is a hamlet in the civil parish of Abbess, Beauchamp and Berners Roding and the Epping Forest district of Essex, England.

The River Roding flows through Birds Green, and feeds three lakes for angling at the northeast of the hamlet.

References

External links 

Epping Forest District
Hamlets in Essex